The Cynthiana Cobblers were a minor league baseball team based in Cynthiana, Kentucky. From 1922 and 1924, Cynthiana teams played exclusively as members of the Class D level Blue Grass League , winning the 1923 league championship. Cynthiana played as the "Merchants" in 1922 and the franchise hosted minor league home games at River Road Park.

History
The 1922 Cynthiana Merchants were the first minor league baseball team in Cynthiana, Kentucky. The Merchants began play as members of the six–team Class D level Blue Grass League. Some sources have the 1922 team moniker as the "Philanthropists." The 1922 league franchises were the Cynthiana Merchants (34–30), Lexington Reds (28–36), Maysville Cardinals (33–28), Mount Sterling Essex (30–31), Paris Bourbons (36–28) and Winchester Dodgers (28–36).

The "Merchants" moniker was used in reference to local merchants contributing funds to purchase uniforms and equipment for the new team. The Merchants who sponsored the team had their business name(s) displayed on the backs of the Cynthiana uniforms.

Beginning play in the 1922 Blue Grass League, the Merchants won the 2nd–half standings and advanced to the Finals. In the overall standings, Cynthiana placed 3rd with their record of 34–30 under manager Ernest McIlvan. The Merchants finished 2.0 games behind the 1st place Paris Bourbons in the overall standings. The Maysville Cardinals, with a 16–6 record, won the 1st half standings and Cynthiana, with a 25–17 record, won the 2nd half standings. The two teams met in a playoff series to decide the championship. In the 1922 Finals, the Maysville Cardinals defeated Cynthiana 3 games to 1 to win the championship.

Continuing play in the 1923 Blue Grass League season, the team became the "Cynthiana Cobblers" and won the league championship. With a 54–43 record, the Cobblers finished in 1st place under manager Bill Schumaker and were League Champions. Cynthiana finished 1.0 game ahead of the 2nd place Winchester Dodgers in the final standings of the six–team league. No playoffs were held in 1923.

In their final season of play, the 1924 Cynthiana Cobblers finished a close 2nd in the final standings. With a record of 50–42 under managers Bill Schumaker and John Koval in the four–team Blue Grass League, Cynthiana finished just a 0.5 game behind the 1st place Paris Boosters.No playoffs were held and the Blue Grass League permanently folded after the 1924 season. Cythiana has not hosted another minor league team.

The ballpark
The Cynthiana minor league teams hosted minor league home games at River Road Park. The ballpark was located at River Road & Elm Street, Cynthiana, Kentucky. Today, River Road Park and its ballfield are still use. River Road Park is located at 217 Kentucky Highway 316, Cynthiana, Kentucky.

Timeline

Year–by–year records

Notable alumni

Jim Mullen (1923)
Stan Rees  (1922)

See also
Cynthiana Cobblers playersCynthiana Merchants players

References

External links
Baseball Reference

Professional baseball teams in Kentucky
Defunct baseball teams in Kentucky
Baseball teams established in 1923
Baseball teams disestablished in 1924
Blue Grass League teams
1923 establishments in Kentucky
1924 disestablishments in Kentucky
Cobblers